The 2019 All-Ireland Minor Football Championship was the GAA's premier inter-county Gaelic football competition for under seventeens. Thirty-two county teams from Ireland competed.

2018 was the first minor competition for under 17-year-olds – previously the competition had an under eighteen age limit. The under seventeen championship with a new format was introduced after a vote at the GAA Congress on 26 February 2016.

A league format is followed in Connacht and Leinster. Munster introduced a double league format in 2019 with the winners of an initial Phase 1 league containing weaker teams advancing to a Phase 2 league where they play in a 3-team league with Cork and Kerry. Ulster still plays a knockout championship.

The winners will receive the Tom Markham Cup.

Teams
Thirty-two teams from Ireland contested the championship. New York and London did not participate in this competition.

Competition format

Provincial Championships

Connacht, Leinster, Munster and Ulster each organised provincial championship. Each province decided its own rules for determining their champions. The formats for the 2019 provincial championships are explained in the sections below.

All-Ireland

The four provincial winners play the four provincial runners-up in the All-Ireland quarterfinals. Two semi-finals and a final follow. All matches are played in a single knockout format. The minor final is normally played before the All-Ireland senior final.

Provincial championships

Connacht Minor Football Championship

Connacht Format

All five Connacht counties compete in a single round robin format. The top three teams in the round robin table meet again in the Connacht semi-final and final.

The winners receive the Tom Kilcoyne Cup.

Connacht Table

Connacht League Section Rounds 1 to 5

Connacht Semi Final

Connacht Final

Leinster Minor Football Championship

Leinster Format

Leinster teams competed in 3 groups, each of 4 teams. Each team in a group plays a single match against the other teams. The first two teams in each group progress to the Leinster semi-finals.

Leinster Group 1 table

Leinster Group 1 Rounds 1 to 3

Leinster Group 2 table

Leinster Group 2 Rounds 1 to 3

Leinster Group 3 table

Leinster Group 3 Rounds 1 to 3

Leinster Quarter-Finals

Leinster Semi-Finals

Leinster Final

Munster Minor Football Championship

Munster Format

The four weakest Munster teams compete in a league known as Phase 1.

The winner of Phase 1 competes in a further league known as Phase 2

Munster Phase 1

Munster Phase 1 League Rounds 1 to 4

Phase 1 Round 1	Clare	3-15	Limerick	0-10	10/4	Newcastlewest	Brendan Griffin (Kerry)	

Phase 1 Round 1	Tipperary	4-13	Waterford	0-7	10/4	Sean Treacy Park Tipperary Town	John Ryan (Cork)	

Phase 1 Round 2	Clare	1-10	Tipperary	0-6	17/4	Cusack Park Ennis	Seamus Mulvihill (Kerry)	

Phase 1 Round 2	Waterford	1-7	Limerick	0-10	17/4	Fraher Field Dungarvan	Sean Lonergan (Tipperary)	

Phase 1 Round 3	Tipperary	0-10	Limerick	0-10	24/4	Sean Treacy Park Tipperary Town	Chris Maguire (Clare)	

Phase 1 Round 3	Waterford	2-7	Clare	1-9	24/4	Fraher Field Dungarvan	Jonathan Hayes (Limerick)	

Phase 1 Final	Clare	3-12	Tipperary	0-6	8/5	LIT Gaelic Grounds	Sean Joy (Kerry)	

Team	Played	Won	Drawn	Lost	Scores For	Scores Against	Score Difference	Points

Clare	3	2	0	1	5-34 (49)	2-23 (29)	+20	4

Tipperary	3	1	1	1	4-29 (41)	1-27 (30)	+11	3

Waterford	3	1	1	1	3-21 (30)	5-32 (47)	-17	3

Limerick	3	0	2	1	0-30 (30)	4-32 (44)	-14	2

Munster Phase 2

Phase 2 Round 1	Kerry	3-19	Cork	1-9	7/5	Páirc Uí Rinn	Alan Kissane (Waterford)	

Phase 2 Round 2	Cork	3-9	Clare	0-14	15/5	Cusack Park Ennis	Brendan Griffin (Kerry)	

Phase 2 Round 3	Kerry	1-16	Clare	0-11	23/5	Austin Stack Park Tralee	Donnacha O’Callaghan (Limerick)	

2019 Munster Minor Football Championship Table Phase 2

Team	Played	Won	Drawn	Lost	Scores For	Scores Against	Score Difference	Points

Kerry	2	2	0	0	4-35 (47)	1-20 (23)	+24	4

Cork	2	1	0	1	4-18 (30)	3-33 (42)	-12	2

Clare	2	0	0	2	0-25 (25)	4-25 (37)	-12	0

Munster Final

Ulster Minor Football Championship

For official fixtures and results see Ulster Minor Football Championship at ulstergaa.ie

Ulster Format

In 2018 the Ulster Championship changed to a double-elimination format, which replaced the straight knockout style of previous years. Every team who lost a match before the semi-finals re-entered the competition via the Qualifiers Round 1 (R1), Qualifiers Round 2 (R2) or Qualifiers Round 3 (R3). This ensured that all teams played at least two games. The semi-finals and final were knockout.

The winners received the Father Murray Cup.

Ulster Direct Route

Ulster Preliminary Round 

Two of the nine teams were drawn to play in the preliminary round.

Ulster Round 1 

The seven teams who avoided the preliminary round plus the winners of the preliminary round competed in four matches in round 1.

Ulster Round 2 

The four winning teams from round 1 met in two matches.

Ulster Qualifier Route

Ulster Qualifiers R1 

Two of the five teams beaten in the preliminary round or round 1 met in a playoff match. The losing team was eliminated from the competition.

Ulster Qualifiers R2 

The four remaining teams who lost only one match in the preliminary round or round 1 met in two matches with the two losing teams being eliminated,

Ulster Qualifiers R3 

The two losing teams from round 2 (who lost only one match) met the two winning teams from the qualifiers R2. The two losing teams were eliminated from the competition.

Ulster Knockout Stage

Ulster Semi-Finals

The two winning teams from round 2 met the two winning teams from the qualifiers R3. The two losing teams were eliminated from the competition.

Ulster Final

All-Ireland

For official fixtures and results see All Ireland Minor Football Championship @ gaa.ie

All-Ireland Draw

Quarter-finals

Semi-finals

Final

Minor Team Of The Year

See also
 2019 All-Ireland Senior Football Championship
 2019 All-Ireland Under-20 Football Championship

References

All-Ireland Minor Football Championship
All-Ireland Minor Football Championship